Mehdi Mostefa Sbaa (born 30 August 1983) is a professional footballer who plays as a defensive midfielder for Béziers. Born in France, he represented Algeria at international level.

Personal
Mostefa was born in Dijon, France, to an Algerian father and a French mother. His father is originally from the town of Mazouna in the Relizane Province in Algeria.

Club career
On 6 June 2011, Mostefa signed a two years contract with newly promoted Ligue 1 side AC Ajaccio.

On 7 August 2014, Mostefa moved to FC Lorient for a three years contract because he's interested with the club project.

On 27 August 2015, Bastia reached an agreement with Lorient to sign Mostefa.

International career
On 30 October 2010, Mostefa was called up to the Algeria national team by head coach Abdelhak Benchikha for a friendly against Luxembourg. He made his debut in that game as a starter, before being substituted off in the 69th minute. On 30 March 2011, Mostefa played his first official match for Algeria in a 2012 Africa Cup of Nations qualifier against Morocco. He played the entire match as Algeria went on to win 1–0.

References

External links
 
 
 

Living people
1983 births
Sportspeople from Dijon
Footballers from Bourgogne-Franche-Comté
Association football midfielders
Algerian footballers
French footballers
French sportspeople of Algerian descent
Algerian people of French descent
Nîmes Olympique players
AS Monaco FC players
ASOA Valence players
Montluçon Football players
FC Sète 34 players
AC Ajaccio players
FC Lorient players
SC Bastia players
Pafos FC players
AS Béziers (2007) players
Ligue 2 players
Ligue 1 players
French expatriate footballers
Algerian expatriate footballers
Algeria international footballers
2013 Africa Cup of Nations players
Algerian expatriate sportspeople in Cyprus
French expatriate sportspeople in Cyprus
Expatriate footballers in Cyprus
2014 FIFA World Cup players